Jeffrey Scott Holland, (born May 13, 1966), is an artist, writer and musician living both in New York City and in Louisville, Kentucky. He is an active member of the Stuckist and Remodernist art movements, holding a traveling exhibit of Stuckist art in the United States in 2001, and co-curating the Deatrick Gallery, the first Remodernist art gallery worldwide.

Holland cites painters Bernard Buffet and Georges Rouault as influences, and works in a primitive impasto style similar to that of fellow Stuckist, Billy Childish.

In addition to painting, Holland also works in photography, sculpture, graffiti and mixed media.

Recent solo exhibitions
 July 2003: Desperate Telegrams, Gallerie Soleil, Lexington, Kentucky.
 January 2004: Worthless Advice, Cinderblock Gallery, Louisville.
 February 2005: Clowns in Love, Jigsaw Gallery, New York City.
 February 2006: Jefferson County Confidential, Deatrick Gallery, Louisville.
 April 2006: Project Egg, installation of art-filled easter eggs, Chicago, Atlanta, Cincinnati, St. Louis, Nashville, and Indianapolis.
 June 2006: Appalachian Voodoo, Black Box Gallery, Seattle.
 June 2006: Outhouse in Flames, Morgan Art Space, Brooklyn.
 April 2007: Fuel to Build a Fire, KISS Coffeehouse, Myrtle Beach, SC

References

External links
Jeffrey Scott Holland Official Site
Jeffrey Scott Holland's Epitaph For Hasil Adkins
 unofficial fan site

1966 births
Living people
20th-century American painters
American male painters
21st-century American painters
21st-century American male artists
Stuckism
Artists from Louisville, Kentucky
20th-century American male artists